Dancing with the Stars, Nepal is a celebrity dance reality show licensed by BBC Studios based on the format of the British TV series Strictly Come Dancing. The show is produced by ANC Production, production house which have produced The Voice of Nepal. The show is directed by Laxman Poudyal, director of The Voice of Nepal, The Voice Kids and Nepal Idol Season 1. For the first season 12 celebrity and choreographers will compete to win the title. Second season of Dancing Stars Nepal has already been announced and will air on TV very soon .

Format 
The format of the show consists of a celebrity paired with a professional dancer. Each couple performs predetermined dances and competes against the others for judges' points and audience votes. In Nepal, audience can vote from IME Pay App.

Cast

Host 
For the first season, show makers announced that participant of Nepal's first comedy reality show - Comedy Champion top 5 participant, Suman Karki and Miss Nepal World 2010, Sadichha Shrestha will be hosting this season.

Judges 
Actress/dancer Gauri Malla, actor/dancer Dilip Rayamajhi and film director, producer & choreographer Renasha Bantawa Rai will be judging the show.

Season 1

Participants 

For the first season, there would be 11 couples competing for the title.

Celebrity Guests

Scoring Chart 

 Rakshya was injured while practising dance so due to health condition doctor advice to take at least 2 months bed rest Rakshya & Saroj Team Rakroj quit the show. However Saroj dance beat appreciated by all judges and there are not in bottom three in week 2
 Puja Thakurs choreographer change Saroj team name is Puroj in week 4
 Priyana Acharya and Saroj wild card entry in week 5
 indicate the highest score for each week
 indicate the lowest score for each week
 indicates profomance of the week.
 the couple eliminated that week
 the returning couple that was in the bottom two
 the couple withdrew from the competition
 the couple won immunity and did not dance off
 the winning couple
 the runner-up couple
 the third place couple

Season 2 
Soon, Season 2 of Dancing with the stars will be aired on Himalaya TV HD . The star participants and choreographer will be announced soon .

Participants

Scoring Chart 

 Rakshya was injured while practicing dance so due to health condition with doctor advice to take at least 2 months bed rest. Rakshya & Saroj Team Rakroj quit the show. However Saroj dance beat was appreciated by all judges and there are not in bottom three in week 2
 Puja Thakurs choreographer change Saroj team name is Puroj in week 4
 Priyana Acharya and Saroj wild card entry in week 5
 indicate the highest score for each week
 indicate the lowest score for each week
 indicates profomance of the week.
 the couple eliminated that week
 the returning couple that was in the bottom two
 the couple withdrew from the competition
 the couple won immunity and did not dance off
 the winning couple
 the runner-up couple
 the third place couple

References

Dancing with the Stars
Nepalese reality television series
2020s Nepalese television series
2020 Nepalese television series debuts
Nepali-language television shows
Television shows filmed in Nepal